Leander Paes and Radek Štěpánek were the defending champions but lost in the first round to Kevin Anderson and Jonathan Erlich.

Bob and Mike Bryan won the title by defeating Robin Haase and Igor Sijsling 6–3, 6–4 in the final. The win was their 13th Grand Slam men's doubles title, giving them sole possession of the all-time record for a doubles team. The twins had previously been tied with Australians John Newcombe and Tony Roche. Additionally, this was the Bryan's 5th consecutive Australian Open final and 9th in the past decade.

Seeds

Draw

Finals

Top half

Section 1

Section 2

Bottom half

Section 3

Section 4

References

Draw
Draw (PDF Form)

External links
 2013 Australian Open – Men's draws and results at the International Tennis Federation

Men's Doubles
Australian Open (tennis) by year – Men's doubles